(1563 – October 21, 1616) was a Japanese daimyō of the early Edo period, who served as lord of the Tsuwano Domain. 
Originally called Ukita Akiie (宇喜多 詮家) he first served his uncle Ukita Naoie and then his son Ukita Hideie. He took part in the attack against the Uesugi of Aizu, and later in the Sekigahara campaign, he left Ukita's Western army and joined Tokugawa's eastern army. After the war, he was given lordship of the Tsuwano domain. Tokugawa Ieyasu also gave him a new name Sakazaki (坂崎).

References

References
This article has been compiled from corresponding material on the Japanese Wikipedia.
Tsuwano domain genealogy (in Japanese)

Ukita clan
1563 births
1616 deaths
Tozama daimyo
People of Muromachi-period Japan
People of Azuchi–Momoyama-period Japan
People of Edo-period Japan